Adhemarius sexoculata is a species of moth in the family Sphingidae. It was described by Augustus Radcliffe Grote in 1865,

Distribution 
Is known from Brazil, Venezuela, Ecuador, Bolivia and Peru.

Description 
The length of the forewings is 55–61 mm. There are at least two generations per year with peak flights in February and from July to August.

Biology 
The larvae feed on Ocotea veraguensis, Ocotea atirrensis and Ocotea dendrodaphne.

References

Adhemarius
Moths described in 1865
Moths of South America